The 2013 Illinois Fighting Illini football team represented the University of Illinois at Urbana–Champaign in the 2013 NCAA Division I FBS football season. They were led by second-year head coach Tim Beckman, and played their home games at Memorial Stadium. They were a member of the Leaders Division of the Big Ten Conference. They finished the season 4–8, 1–7 in Big Ten play to finish in fifth place in the Leaders Division.

Previous season
Illinois finished the 2012 season with 2–10, 0–8 in Big 10 Leaders play, where they placed last and failed to become bowl eligible for first time since 2009.

Personnel

Coaching staff

Roster

Schedule

Chicago homecoming

For only the second time in Soldier Field's 89 year history, the stadium hosted the Illinois Fighting Illini football team. The Fighting Illini's last appearance at Soldier Field was during the 1994 season in which the team lost 10–9 to #22 ranked Washington State Cougars. Additionally, the University of Illinois Alumni Association, Illinois Foundation, and Division and Intercollegiate Athletics are hosting an "Illini Fest" family tailgate prior the start of the football game. The event is modeled after Chicago Street Festivals that are popular throughout Neighborhoods in Chicago.

Game summaries

Southern Illinois

Cincinnati

Washington

Miami (OH)

Nebraska

Wisconsin

Michigan State

Penn State

Indiana

Ohio State

Purdue

Northwestern

References

Illinois
Illinois Fighting Illini football seasons
Illinois Fighting Illini football